John Howard Mathisen (22 September 1921 – 17 December 1983) was an Australian rules footballer who played with Hawthorn in the Victorian Football League (VFL).

Notes

External links 

1921 births
1983 deaths
Australian rules footballers from Melbourne
Hawthorn Football Club players
People from Sorrento, Victoria